BAE Systems AB—also known as BAE Systems Hägglunds—is a Swedish defence company and a subsidiary of BAE Systems Land & Armaments, whose ultimate parent is the British defence contractor BAE Systems. 

The company is a holding company for Land Systems Hägglunds AB and BAE Systems Bofors AB, and has no products of its own.

Subsidiaries

BAE Systems Hägglunds
AB Hägglund & Söner was founded in 1899 by Johan Hägglund in Gullänget, Örnsköldsvik, Sweden. The company was divided in 1988, one part being Hägglunds Vehicle AB, the military vehicles business. In October 1997 the British company Alvis plc acquired Hägglunds Vehicle AB to form Alvis Hägglunds AB. Alvis expanded its military vehicle business in 1998 with the purchase of GKN's armoured vehicle division in 1998 and Vickers Defence in 2002 to form Alvis Vickers. In September 2004 BAE Systems acquired Alvis Vickers and merged it with its RO Defence ordnance division to form BAE Systems Land Systems. Hägglunds was renamed Land Systems Hägglunds.

In June 2005 BAE Systems acquired United Defense and reorganised its land systems businesses into BAE Systems Land and Armaments, with Land Systems and Land Systems Hägglunds as subsidiaries of this U.S. based operating group.

BAE Systems Bofors
BAE Systems Bofors AB, located in Karlskoga, Sweden, is a Swedish subsidiary of BAE Systems Platforms & Services.

Its corporate heritage goes back to Bofors, which was founded in 1646 and entered the Defence business in 1883. In 1999 Saab purchased the Celsius Group, the parent group of Bofors. In September 2000 United Defense Industries (UDI) purchased Bofors Weapon Systems from Saab (the tube artillery interests), while Saab retained the missile interests. In 2005 BAE Systems purchased UDI and re-organised all its land systems businesses into BAE Systems Land and Armaments. As part of acquisition Bofors Defence was renamed BAE Systems Bofors.

BAE Systems C-ITS
The company provides "Interactive Training and Simulation". It was a former United Defense company. On 28 November 2007, BAE Systems acquired the Swedish high-tech company Pitch Technologies AB, an innovator of computer-based research simulation and training technologies.

Products

All-terrain vehicles
 Bandvagn 202 tracked articulated all-terrain vehicle
 Bandvagn 206 tracked articulated all-terrain vehicle
 BvS 10 tracked articulated all-terrain vehicle

Combat vehicles
 Pansarbandvagn 302
 Combat Vehicle 90
 SEP
Stridsvagn 122

Weapon systems
 40 mm Tridon
 40 mm TriAD
 Archer SP Artillery
 FH 77 Howitzer
 Bofors 57 mm & Bofors 40 mm Naval guns

Ammunitions
 Bofors Bonus Anti-armour artillery shell.
 XM982 Excalibur Ammunition
 3P Ammunition

Camouflage
 Adaptiv

References

Land Systems Hägglunds: The Company History (Accessed Jan. 10 2006)
companies.infobasepub.com: BAE Systems Land Systems Hägglunds (Accessed Jan. 10 2006)

BAE Systems subsidiaries and divisions
Defence companies of Sweden
Bofors
Swedish companies established in 2006
Holding companies of Sweden
Holding companies established in 2006